Lake Elton is a salt lake in Volgograd Oblast, Russia, near the border with Kazakhstan. It has an area of 152 km² and is about 0.1 m deep (in spring 0.7 to 0.8 m). Its surface is 18 m below sea level. The lake’s name originates from the Mongol language: “Altyn-Nor” (Golden Bottom). Long ago local nomads used the lake’s mineral-rich mud for skin and respiratory treatments. For centuries, Lake Elton was a favorite location for Russian rulers and nobles. One can still see remnants of Empress Yekaterina II’s “bath” there.

It is the largest mineral lake in Europe and one of the most mineralized in the world. The lake is filled with saturated salt solution. Mineralization is 200-500 g/L. Salt, extracted from the lake since the early 18th century, is used for the production of magnesium chloride. The water contains Dunaliella salina algae that give a reddish shade to the lake. At the bottom of the lake - deposits of salts (mainly NaCl, KCl) and under them a layer of mineral hydrogen sulfide mud.

Transportation 
A bus ride can be taken from Volgograd (6 hours mostly because of long stops in rural towns) and also by train from Saratov and Astrakhan (also 6 hours) can lead travelers to the area.

History 
Salt was excavated from Elton beginning in the early eighteenth century. Before 1865 the government was the excavator; from 1865–1882 the lake was heavily used by private businesses.
 
A spa resort has been located near the lake since 1910 and a sanatorium since 1945. Sulfide silt mud and brine from Elton are claimed to have anti-inflammatory, detoxifying, analgesic, relaxing and revitalizing properties.

Elton Ultra Trail Run 
The Elton Ultra Trail is one of Russia's toughest races. There are two distances of 38 km and 100 miles. It was first organised in 2014.

References

External links
 Photos from Elton
Elton Ultra Trail

Lakes of Volgograd Oblast
Endorheic lakes of Europe
Saline lakes of Europe